Erik Berg (6 October 1876 – 1 January 1945) was a Finnish politician. Berg was born in Livonia and was of Baltic German descent. He served in the Imperial Russian Army, and later became a member of the Senate of Finland. After the 1917 February Revolution, Berg moved to France where he worked as a businessman. He died in Paris, France.

References

Finnish politicians
Finnish senators
1876 births
1945 deaths
Finnish expatriates in France
Finnish people of Baltic German descent
Finnish people from the Russian Empire